David Lam was the 25th Lieutenant Governor of British Columbia, Canada.

David Lam may also refer to:

David K. Lam, American tech entrepreneur
David Lam (film director), Hong Kong film director